New Issues Poetry & Prose is a literary press associated with Western Michigan University. It was founded by poet and Western Michigan University professor Herbert S. Scott. Editors have included poets William Olsen and Nancy Eimers.

The Huffington Post has called New Issues Press one of fifteen small presses in the United States that "exemplify the best qualities of [the American] publishing tradition." After a two-week vote, Huffington Post readers named New Issues number one in the country among the fifteen small presses cited.

The press publishes predominantly poetry, along with some fiction titles, including the AWP Award Series in the Novel. The press awards two poetry prizes each year, The New Issues Poetry Prize for a first book, and The Green Rose Prize for established poets.

Winners of The New Issues Poetry Prize include Paul Guest, Sandra Beasley, Jason Bredle, Matthew Thorburn, Bradley Paul, Malena Mörling, Heidi Lynn Staples, Louise Mathias, Marsha de la O, and Cynie Cory. Winners of The Green Rose Prize include Corey Marks, Noah Eli Gordon, Seth Abramson, Joan Houlihan, Christine Hume, Martha Rhodes, Hugh Seidman, Ruth Ellen Kocher and Christopher Bursk.

The press has also published a number of prominent Michigan poets through its Inland Seas Poetry Series, including Jim Daniels, David Dodd Lee, Anthony Butts, Lee Upton, John Rybicki, and Mary Ann Samyn. Other notable poets published by New Issues Press include Michael Burkard, Khaled Mattawa, Claudia Keelan, Lisa Lewis, Brian Henry, Jericho Brown, Sarah Messer, Jon Pineda, Donald Platt, Rebecca Reynolds, Martha Serpas, Gladys Cardiff, and Stacie Cassarino.

All New Issues titles are designed through The Design Center by senior graphic design students in the Frostic School of Art at Western Michigan University, under the supervision of Art Director, Nick Kuder  and Production Manager, Paul Sizer.

References

External links 
 New Issues Press

Small press publishing companies
Book publishing companies based in Michigan
Western Michigan University
Western Michigan University
Literary publishing companies